Pascal Judelewicz is a French film producer, actor and President of Acajou Films.

Filmography

As a film producer
Monsieur (dir. Jean-Philippe Toussaint, 1990).
La sévillane (dir. Jean-Philippe Toussaint, 1992).
Mina Tannenbaum (executive producer, dir. Martine Dugowson, 1994).
La partie d'échecs (dir. Yves Hanchar, 1994).
The Liars (dir. Élie Chouraqui, 1996).
Lucky Punch (dir. Dominique Ladoge, 1996).
Mordbüro (dir. Lionel Kopp, 1997).
Le secret de Polichinelle (co-producer, dir. Franck Landron, 1997).
An Air So Pure (co-producer, dir. Yves Angelo, 1997).
Marie Baie des Anges (executive producer, dir. Manuel Pradal, 1997).
Place Vendôme (dir. Nicole Garcia, 1998).
The Ice Rink (dir. Jean-Philippe Toussaint, 1998).
Les menteurs (dir. Laurent Firode, 1999).
Mon père, ma mère, mes frères et mes sœurs... (dir. Charlotte de Turckheim, 1999).
Uppercut (short film, dir. Patrice Jourdan, Sören Prévost, 2000).
Toreros (dir. Eric Barbier, 2000).
Everybody's Famous! (co-producer, dir. Dominique Deruddere, 2000).
En vacances (dir. Yves Hanchar, 2000).
Happenstance (dir. Laurent Firode, 2000).
Slogans (dir. Gjergj Xhuvani, 2001).
Raisons économiques (shor film, dir. Patrice Jourdan, Sören Prévost, 2002).
Ginostra (executive producer, dir. Manuel Pradal, 2002).
I dashur armik (dir. Gjergj Xhuvani, 2004).
La méthode Bourchnikov (short film, dir. Grégoire Sivan, 2004).
Tideline (Littoral) (co-producer, dir. Wajdi Mouawad, 2004).
Beyond the Ocean (dir. Éliane de Latour, 2006).
Gravida (dir. Alain Robbe-Grillet, 2006).
 (co-producer, dir. Ludi Boeken, 2009).
The Vintner's Luck (dir. Niki Caro, 2009).Q (dir. Laurent Bouhnik, 2011).Vanishing Waves (co-producer, dir. Kristina Buozyte, 2012).Jappeloup (dir. Christian Duguay, 2013).

As an actorThe Ice Rink (dir. Jean-Philippe Toussaint, 1998).En vacances (dir. Yves Hanchar, 2000).Happenstance (dir. Laurent Firode, 2000).Les textiles (dir. Franck Landron, 2004).Gravida (dir. Alain Robbe-Grillet, 2006).The Vintner's Luck (dir. Niki Caro, 2009).
Q (dir. Laurent Bouhnik, 2011).

References

External links 
 

Living people
Year of birth missing (living people)
French film producers
French male film actors